Voievodeasa or Voivodeasa may refer to the following places in Romania:

Voievodeasa, a village in the commune Sucevița, Suceava County
Voievodeasa (Sucevița), a tributary of the Sucevița in Suceava County
Voivodeasa, a tributary of the Toplița in Harghita County